is a Japanese writer. She wrote the children's novel series Telepathy Shōjo Ran and the manga series The Manzai Comics. She started writing children's novels when she was in college. She graduated from Aoyama Gakuin University with the Bachelor of Letters degree. After that, she worked as a temporary teacher of the elementary school in Okayama for two years. She published Hotarukan monogatari as her first novel in 1991. She is married to a dentist and they have two sons and a daughter.

Asano received the Noma Prize for Juvenile Literature in 1997 for the book series Battery, which has been adapted into a film. The same series won the Shogakukan Children's Publication Culture Award in 2005. Her work frequently appears in literary magazines and she has also been featured in the Mainichi Shimbun.

She likes reading mystery novels. One of her favorite mystery novels is Cat of Many Tails, written by Ellery Queen.

She is a supporter of the Japanese Communist Party (JCP).

Works
"Kamigami no Utatane"
"Girls Blue 2"
"Girls Blue"
"Yume Utsutsu"
"The Manzai Comics #1–6"
"Asano Kodomo no Omochabako"
"Neko no Neko-san"
"Telepathy Shōjo Ran"
"Arifureta Fūkeiga"
"Sasayaka na Monogatari-tachi"
"Kimi ni Okuru Tsubasa Monogatari"
"Matteru"
"Last Inning"
"Kaze no Yakata no Monogatari"
"Ashita Fukukaze"
"Shin Hotarukan Monogatari"
"Hotarukan Monogatari"
"Iede de Densha wa Ganbarimasu"
"Miroku no Tsuki"
"Erina no Aoi Sora"
"Vivace"
"Kimi ga Mitsukeru Monogatari"
"Miyama Monogatari"
"Fukushū Planner"
"Konjiki no Nobe ni Utau"
"Battery #1–7"
"Field, wind"
"Tabidachi"
"Chūgakusei no Kimochi"
"Iede Densha wa Koshōchu?"
"Yōkai Henka"
"Jūni no Uso to Jūni no Shinjitsu"
"Yasha-zakura"
"Jūni-sai Deai no Kisetsu"
"Banka no Playball"
"Runner"
"Fukuin no Shōnen"
"Sugu Kakeru Dokushō Kansōbun"
"Nani yori mo Taisetsu na Koto"
"Bokura no Shinrei Spotto"
"Natsu-yasumi"
"Chi ni Umorete"
"Jikū Hunter Yuki"
"Hint?"
"Tōmei na Tabiji to"
"Tanpopo Akichi no Tsukinowa"
"Dobapyon"
"Love Letter"
"Mai wa Jussai desu"
"No. 6"

References

External links

 J'Lit | Authors : Atsuko Asano | Books from Japan 
 
 JLPP author profile
 Battery (Japanese)

1954 births
Living people
Japanese writers
People from Okayama Prefecture